Henri Paret (1854–?) was a French cyclist. He is notable for being the oldest cyclist to ever ride in the Tour de France, riding the 1904 Tour de France at age 50. He finished in 11th place in the race.

References

External links

1854 births
Year of death missing
French male cyclists
Date of death missing
Sportspeople from Saint-Étienne
Cyclists from Auvergne-Rhône-Alpes